Michael McCullough (born July 27, 1969) is an American psychologist and author. He received a PhD from Virginia Commonwealth University in 1995 and an honorary doctorate from the University of Louvain (UCLouvain) in 2015. He is a Professor of Psychology at the University of California, San Diego, where he directs the Evolution and Human Behavior Laboratory. He studies the functions of human behavior and emotions using the conceptual tools of evolutionary psychology and cognitive science. He has conducted research on the measurement of forgiveness, empathy, altruism, prosocial life goals, and early life experience.  He is the author of The Kindness of Strangers: How a Selfish Ape Invented a New Moral Code (Basic Books, 2020) and Beyond Revenge: The Evolution of the Forgiveness Instinct (2008, Jossey-Bass).

Selected bibliography
 The Kindness of Strangers: How a Selfish Ape Invented a New Moral Code. Michael McCullough. Basic Books, 2020. 
 Beyond Revenge: The Evolution of the Forgiveness Instinct. Michael McCullough. Jossey-Bass, 2008. , 
 The Psychology of Gratitude. Emmons, R. A., & McCullough, M. E. (Eds., 2004). New York: Oxford Press.

References

University of Miami faculty
Psychologists of religion
Living people
1969 births